County Hall (sometimes called London County Hall) is a building in the district of Lambeth, London that was the headquarters of London County Council (LCC) and later the Greater London Council (GLC). The building is on the South Bank of the River Thames, with Westminster Bridge being next to it, to the south. It faces west toward the City of Westminster and is close to the Palace of Westminster. It is a Grade II* listed building.

History 

The building was commissioned to replace the mid 19th-century Spring Gardens headquarters inherited from the Metropolitan Board of Works. The site selected by civic leaders was previously occupied by four properties: Float Mead (occupied by Simmond's flour mills), Pedlar's Acre (occupied by wharves and houses), Bishop's Acre (occupied by Crosse & Blackwell's factory) and the Four Acres (occupied by workshops and stables).

The main six storey building was designed by Ralph Knott. It is faced in Portland stone in an Edwardian Baroque style.  The construction, which was undertaken by Holland, Hannen & Cubitts, started in 1911 and the building was opened by King George V in 1922. The North and South blocks, which were built by Higgs and Hill, were added between 1936 and 1939. The Island block was not completed until 1974.

For 64 years County Hall served as the headquarters of local government for London. During the 1980s the then powerful Labour-controlled GLC led by Ken Livingstone was locked in conflict with the Conservative national government of Margaret Thatcher. The façade of County Hall frequently served as a billboard for opposition slogans which could be seen from the Palace of Westminster.

When the government of Margaret Thatcher abolished the GLC in 1986, County Hall lost its role as the seat of London's government. Talk soon became of what was to happen to the building, and there were plans to relocate the London School of Economics to the site which did not proceed. The building remained in use by the Inner London Education Authority (ILEA) until its abolition in 1990 when the building was transferred to the London Residuary Body and eventually sold to Shirayama Shokusan, a Japanese investor. On 21 October 2005, the High Court of England and Wales upheld a bid by the owners of the building, Shirayama Shokusan, to have the Saatchi Gallery evicted on grounds of violating its contract, particularly using space outside of the rented area for exhibits.

The Island block, an annex of the main building, was demolished in 2006 to make way for a hotel, the Park Plaza Westminster Bridge. The building, also known as No 1 Westminster Bridge Road, had been disused since 1986 and had been described as an eyesore.

A blue plaque commemorates the LCC, GLC and the Inner London Education Authority at County Hall.

Attractions
County Hall is the site of businesses and attractions, including the Sea Life London Aquarium and Shrek's Adventure London.

Hotels 
There are two hotels located in County Hall:

 Budget Premier Inn, Premier Inn London County Hall hotel

 Five-star Marriott hotel, London Marriott Hotel County Hall

References

External links

londoncountyhall.com
Survey of London entry
Blitzandblight (archive)

Local government buildings in London
Buildings and structures on the River Thames
Edwardian architecture in London
London
Baroque Revival architecture
London County Council
Greater London Council
Exhibition and conference centres in London
L
History of the London Borough of Lambeth
Grade II* listed buildings in the London Borough of Lambeth
Government buildings completed in 1939